Events from the year 1856 in Russia

Incumbents
 Monarch – Alexander II

Events

 Tretyakov Gallery
 Baltic Shipyard
 The Appearance of Christ Before the People
 Low Marks Again
 Russia lost The Russo Crimean War (1853-1856) due to an Alliance of France, and The Ottoman Empire

Births

Deaths

References

1856 in Russia
Years of the 19th century in the Russian Empire